The Women's 50 metre butterfly competition at the 2019 World Championships was held on 26 and 27 July 2019.

Records
Prior to the competition, the existing world and championship records were as follows.

Results

Heats
The heats were held on 26 July at 11:11.

Swim-off
The swim-off was held on 26 July at 12:02.

Semifinals
The semifinals were held on 26 July at 21:09.

Semifinal 1

Semifinal 2

Final
The final was started on 27 July at 20:02.

References

Women's 50 metre butterfly
2019 in women's swimming